The 2017–2018 Bikarkeppni karla was the 52nd edition of the Icelandic Men's Basketball Cup, won by Tindastóll against former 2-time reigning cup holders KR. The competition is managed by the Icelandic Basketball Federation and the final four was held in Reykjavík, in the Laugardalshöll in January 2018. Pétur Rúnar Birgisson was named the Cup Finals MVP after turning in 22 points, 8 assists and 7 rebounds.

Participating teams
Thirty-six teams signed up for the Cup tournament.

Bracket

Cup Finals MVP

References

External links
2017–2018 Tournament results

Men's Cup